Thokcha (also alternatively ) are tektites and meteorites which serve as amulets. Typically high in iron content, these are traditionally believed to contain a magical, protective power comparable to Tibetan dzi beads. Most thokcha are made of a copper alloy.

The use of meteoric iron has been common throughout the history of ferrous metallurgy. Historically, thokcha were prized for the metallurgical fabrication of weapons, musical instruments, and sacred tools, such as the phurba. Thokcha are an auspicious addition in the metallurgical fabrication of sacred objects cast from panchaloha.

Writer Robert Beer regards meteoric iron as "the supreme substance for forging the physical representation of the vajra or other iron weapons." It was believed that these amulets had been tempered by the celestial gods before falling to earth. Beer describes the metal falling from space as a metaphor for "the indivisibility of form and emptiness." Many meteorite fragments can be found in Tibet due to its high altitude and open landscape.

Age

Thokcha (amulets) are classified into two overlapping periods of origin: the pre-Buddhist period (1000 BC900 AD) and the Buddhist period (after 700 AD). Some of the earliest thokcha can be linked to the Tibetan  Zhangzhung culture.

Types of Thokcha

They can also be used as adornments for clothing, lighters and purses.

Thokcha may represent real or mythological animals, often deities from Tibet's Bön or Buddhist religions. However, since several thokcha are abstract in form, the precise meaning of these pieces remains uncertain.

History 

Thogchags or Thokcha (Wylie: Thog lcags) are worn as amulets by Tibetans, specifically people of the Himalayan regions, for spiritual protection and healing. Created in several forms, they often depict tantric deities, sacred animals, auspicious symbols, and mantras. Many represent ritual supports such as a mirror, phurba, or vajra. Some pieces may be abstract in nature, and the meaning of the form has since been lost in antiquity. Further research is still in the process. Other Thokcha were simply used as ancient arrow points, buckles, body armour, or even old horse trappings.

Genuine pieces are believed to be made from a combination of meteorite, iron, bronze, copper, and a number of other metals. A few of the pre-Buddhist pieces originate from Persia or Central Asia and some are as ancient as 3,000 years old. The rarest and most sought after thokcha are believed to be made from a meteoric metal known as 'Namchak,' which literally means 'sky iron' or 'sky metal.' Very old pieces can have a distinct patina and have been worn out into smooth surfaces after centuries of handling. Many ornaments have unique textures which are almost impossible to replicate.

Popular belief
The word Thokcha is composed of two words; thog that means above, primordial, first, or thunderbolt, and lcags that stands for iron or metal, so the literal meaning of thokcha is "original iron" or "thunderbolt iron."

A popular Tibetan belief  is that thokcha are produced magically when a thunderbolt strikes the earth. Historically, it was believed that if one was to find a thokcha underground by chance, they would work as a good luck charm.

A gesture of sympathetic magic portrays that if you cast vajras from the metal, it would return a piece of the original iron to the site where it was found.

See also
 Glossary of meteoritics
 Iron Man, a Tibetan sculpture of Vaiśravaṇa carved from an iron meteorite
 Panchaloha
 Orichalcum

Notes

References
Anninos, Tony, Tokches – Images of Change in Early Buddhist Tibet, Orientations, October 1998, 29(9): 93.
Anninos, Tony, Thokcha: the Ancient Amulets of Tibet, Thokcha World, The Max Maxwell Collection, San Francisco, 2000.
Bellezza, John Vincent, "Thog lcags", The Tibet Journal, 1994, 19(1): 92–97.
Bellezza, John Vincent, "Thogchags: Talismans of Tibet", Arts of Asia, May–June 1998, 28(3): 44–64.
John, Gudrun, Tibetische Amulette aus Himmelseisen - Das Geheimnis der Toktschaks, VML-Verlag, Raden/Westf., 2006.
Lin, Tung-Kuang, Antique Tibetan Thogchags and Seals, The Art of Tibet, Taipei, 2003.
Weihreter, Hans, Thog-lcags. Geheimnisvolle Amulette Tibets. PDF-Dokument, Edition Kyung, Augsburg, 2002.

External links

 Thokcha ~ Tibetan Amulets
 Tibetan Meteorite
 http://www.asianart.com/articles/thogchags/index.html
 http://www.asianart.com/articles/vestiges/index.html

Tibetan culture
Meteorites in culture
Amulets